The 2022 Dudley Metropolitan Borough Council election took place on 5 May 2022. One third of councillors—24 out of 72—on Dudley Metropolitan Borough Council were elected, with 1 ward (Halesowen South) electing 2 councillors. The election took place alongside other local elections across the United Kingdom.

In the previous council election in 2021, the Conservatives gained a majority on the council, holding 46 seats after the election with Labour holding 24 of the others, with two independent councillors.

Background

History 

The Local Government Act 1972 created a two-tier system of metropolitan counties and districts covering Greater Manchester, Merseyside, South Yorkshire, Tyne and Wear, the West Midlands, and West Yorkshire starting in 1974. Dudley was a district of the West Midlands metropolitan county. The Local Government Act 1985 abolished the metropolitan counties, with metropolitan districts taking on most of their powers as metropolitan boroughs. The West Midlands Combined Authority was created in 2016 and began electing the mayor of the West Midlands from 2017, which was given strategic powers covering a region coterminous with the former West Midlands metropolitan county.

Dudley Council has variously been under Labour control, Conservative control and no overall control since it was established. The Conservatives controlled the council from the 2004 election until Labour gained control in the 2012 election. Labour lost overall control in the 2016 election but continued to lead the council until 2017, when the Conservatives led the council, still without a majority. In the most recent election in 2021, the Conservatives gained twelve seats at the expense of Labour and the UK Independence Party to hold an overall majority of seats, with 46 of the 72 total. Labour held 24 of the remaining seats, and there were two independents.

Positions up for election in 2022 were last elected in 2018. In that election the Conservatives won 14 seats and Labour won 10.

Council term 
The Labour Party suspended the councillor Zahir Islam in March 2022. The Labour Against Antisemitism campaign had submitted a complaint against him in September 2021 over social media posts.

Electoral process 

The council elects its councillors in thirds, with a third being up for election every year for three years, with no election in the fourth year. The election will take place by first-past-the-post voting, with wards generally being represented by three councillors, with one elected in each election year to serve a four-year term.

All registered electors (British, Irish, Commonwealth and European Union citizens) living in Dudley aged 18 or over will be entitled to vote in the election. People who live at two addresses in different councils, such as university students with different term-time and holiday addresses, are entitled to be registered for and vote in elections in both local authorities. Voting in-person at polling stations will take place from 07:00 to 22:00 on election day, and voters will be able to apply for postal votes or proxy votes in advance of the election.

Campaign 
Peter Walker, the political correspondent for The Guardian, wrote that Labour would want to "show progress" in the council. The Conservative council leader Patrick Harley said he was confident that his party would gain seats in the election.

Previous council composition 

Changes:
 February 2022: David Vickers (Conservative) dies; seat left vacant until 2022 election
 March 2022: Zafar Islam suspended from Labour

Results 

Seat change includes Halesowen South, which was last elected in 2021.

Results by ward
An asterisk indicates an incumbent councillor.

Amblecote

Belle Vale

Brierley Hill

The incumbent councillor, Zafar Islam, was elected for the Labour Party but suspended in March 2022.

Brockmoor and Pensnett

Castle and Priory

Coseley East

Cradley and Wollescote

Gornal

Halesowen North

Halesowen South

Ray Burston, the outgoing incumbent, was elected as a Conservative but had the whip withdrawn in December 2020.

Hayley Green and Cradley South

Kingswinford North and Wall Heath

Kingswinford South

Lye and Stourbridge North

Netherton, Woodside and St Andrew's

Norton

The incumbent councillor, Colin Elcock, was elected for the Conservative Party but was expelled in November 2020.

Pedmore and Stourbridge East

Quarry Bank and Dudley Wood

Sedgley

St James's

St Thomas's

Upper Gornal and Woodsetton

Wollaston and Stourbridge Town

Wordsley

References 

Dudley Council elections
Dudley